Leandro Vieira is a Brazilian jiu-jitsu instructor and competitor, and a co-founder of Checkmat. He is also the Brazilian jiu-jitsu head coach for the MMA team at American Kickboxing Academy, renowned for being one of the most successful teams in the world.

Brazilian jiu-jitsu 

Leandro Vieira began training jiu-jitsu at a very young age: only 5 years old. He is known as one of the best Brazilian jiu-jitsu instructors in the world. He has won medals at IBJJF Championships such as the Brazilian jiu-jitsu World Championships, Brazilian Nationals, Paulista Regionals, Las Vegas Open and Submission Ink Grappling Tournament. He holds a 4th-Degree Black Belt in Brazilian jiu-jitsu.

Leandro's records 

1999 - 1st place Blue Belt Feather Weight at the Brazilian Nationals
2000 - 3rd place Purple Belt Feather Weight at the World jiu-jitsu Championship
2002 - 1st place Brown Belt at the Regional Paulista jiu-jitsu Championship
2010 - 3rd place Black Belt Absolute Division at Submission Ink Grappling Tournament
2010 - 3rd place Black Belt Master Medium Heavy at the Las Vegas International Open
2011 - 2nd place Black Belt Master Medium Heavy at the Las Vegas International Open

Checkmat BJJ 

One of the most successful teams in contemporary Brazilian jiu-jitsu, Checkmat's worldwide headquarters is in São Paulo, Brazil. CheckMat was established in 2008 by its founder and head coach, Leo Vieira. Since its creation, Checkmat has become one of the top teams in Brazilian jiu-jitsu.

Checkmat's records 

2013
2nd Place - World Championship
1st Place - European Open Championship Adult and Female
3rd Place - European Open Championship Master & Senior
3rd Place - European Open No-Gi Championship

2012
1st Place - Pan Kids Championship
2nd Place - Pan Championship

2011
1st Place - World No-Gi Championship
2nd Place - World Championship
1st Place - Brazilian Nationals Adult
2nd Place - Brazilian Nationals Female
3rd Place -  European Open Championship Adult
1st Place -  European Open Championship Female
1st Place -  European Open Championship Master & Senior
2nd Place -  European Open Championship Novice

2010
2nd Place -  World No-Gi Championship Adult
2nd Place -  World No-Gi Championship Female
3rd Place -  World Championship
2nd Place -  European Open Championship Adult
1st Place -  European Open Championship Master & Senior
3rd Place -  European Open Championship Novice

2009
1st Place -  World No-Gi Championship Adult
3rd Place -  World Championship
1st Place -  European Open Championship Adult
2nd Place -  European Open Championship Master & Senior
3rd Place -  European Open Championship Novice

2008
1st Place - World No-Gi Championship

American Kickboxing Academy 

The American Kickboxing Academy (AKA) is a martial arts gym based in San Jose, California. It is one of the pioneering schools of mixed martial arts (MMA). There are two locations in San Jose, AKA headquarters and their sister academy in South San Jose. In 2014 AKA opened AKA Thailand Gym in Phuket Thailand. Prominent trainers include Brazilian jiu-jitsu master Leandro Vieira, Bob Cook, Derek Yuen, Javier Mendez, and Andy Fong. Within the facility, Muay Thai, Brazilian Jiu-jitsu, Wrestling and Boxing classes are taught. Additional programs include conditioning and circuit training with TRX Suspension and Combat Circuit.

References

Official Vieira Bros Web Site
Official Checkmat Website
Official Checkmat USA
International Brazilian jiu-jitsu Federation Website

Living people
1981 births
Brazilian practitioners of Brazilian jiu-jitsu
People awarded a black belt in Brazilian jiu-jitsu
Sportspeople from Rio de Janeiro (state)

ja:アンドレ・ガウヴァオン